"Draco"  is a song by American rapper Future released as the lead single for his eponymous fifth studio album Future (2017). The song was written by Nayvadius Wilburn and was produced by DJ Spinz. The single peaked at number 46 on the US Billboard Hot 100.

Critical reception
Sheldon Pearce of Pitchfork described the song as "Future is shooting a starter pistol in the air mid-victory lap". “Draco” refers to the Romanian shortened AK-47 assault rifle.

Chart performance
"Draco" debuted and peaked at number 46 on the US  Billboard Hot 100 a week after release. It is the second highest-charting song taken from the album. On October 19, 2017, the song was certified platinum for combined sales and streaming equivalent units of over a million units in the United States.

Charts

Certifications

References

2017 singles
Future (rapper) songs
Songs written by Future (rapper)
Songs written by DJ Spinz
2016 songs